Anuwat Kaewsamrit (อนุวัฒน์ แก้วสัมฤทธิ์, born November 17, 1981) is a Thai Muay Thai kickboxer and a former Lumpinee and four time Rajadamnern Stadium champion who used to fight out of Kaewsamrit Gym in Bangkok. Anuwat is known for his powerful hands, he's often referred to as “The Iron Hands of Siam”. Now, he is currently the head coach of Impax Academy Thailand.

Biography

Young age
Anuwat Kaewsamrit was born as Apisak Rongpichai in Nakhon Sri Thammarat province in the south of Thailand on November 17, 1981. At the age of 13, he went to Bangkok to stay with a friend, who was training at the newly formed Kaewsamrit camp. At first, Anuwat was an assistant for gym, but he decided to join the gym as a trainee and he trained for 6 months. After his first training period, he had his first fight at the age of 14 in Pattaya.

On October 31, 1998, when he was 17 years old, he had his first foreign bout against Hinari Fukatsu who was the current Japanese national champion of SNKA at flyweight in Japan. He knocked down twice in the 4th round and knocked down twice in 5th round. The referee stopped the bout at second knock down in 5th round.

Winning national titles
Two years later, after 35 fights, he got chance to fight for his first stadium title. On November 18, 1998, Anuwat knocked out Klangsuan Sasiprapa Gym in the 4th round and he won the Rajadamnern Stadium title at Mini flyweight (105 lb, 47.727 kg).

On June 10, 1999, he won his second title by beating Kayasit Sakmuangklaeng for the Rajadamnern Stadium title at Junior flyweight. Anuwat's reputation was growing, he made a name for himself as a fighter who had the ability to come from behind to snatch the victory, usually by way of his devastating punches.

On February 2, 2000, Anuwat won his 3rd title in his career, beating Prakaipetch Kiatpailin to take the Rajadamnern Stadium title at Junior bantamweight.

On May 6, 2005, Anuwat fought against Nopparat Keatkhamtorn who was the current champion of Lumpinee Stadium at Featherweight to unify the titles. He knocked out Nopparat with a right cross in the 1st round, and he won the Lumpinee Stadium title. For this bout, he became the unified champion of Rajadamnern Stadium and Lumpinee Stadium at featherweight. This was the first time in Thai history.

On October 29, 2005, Anuwat fought against Riki Onodera who was the Japanese national champion at featherweight in Japan for his retirement bout. He knocked down Onodera in the end of 1st round with a right elbow strike. In the 2nd round, he knocked down twice with a left hook and a right low kick, and the referee stopped the bout when Anuwat knocked down Onodera at 3rd time with a right hook.

Winning world titles
In 2005, World Boxing Council (WBC) established new championships of Muay Thai and Anuwat was offered for its title. He fought against Singtongnoi Por.Telakun for the vacant first WBC Muay Thai title at featherweight on October 19, 2006. He won his first world title in his career with TKO in 3rd round.

On August 22, 2008, he fought against Santipab Sit. Au. Ubon at Lumpinee Stadium for the vacant title of WPMF World featherweight title. He won by split decision at 5R.

On March 1, 2009, he had a defending match against Shunta from Japan for WPMF World Featherweight title in the event of "M.I.D Japan presents M-1 Fairtex Muay Thai Challenge 2009 Yod Nak Suu vol.1". He knocked down with a left hook in the 1st round and the referee stopped the bout when Anuwat knocked down with a right hook.

On June 26, in Montego Bay, Jamaica, Anuwat challenged Liam Harrison's WMC World Lightweight title, and won by TKO of the third round with right low kicks.

On July 11, 2010, in Ariake, Tokyo, he had a defending bout against Shin Saenchi gym from Japan to defend his WPMF Featherweight title. He knocked out with a right cross in 5th round.

Titles
 Rajadamnern Stadium
 2010 Rajadamnern Stadium Super-featherweight Champion
 2004 Rajadamnern Stadium Fight of the Year (vs. Seanchernglak Jirakrengkrai)
 2004 Rajadamnern Stadium Fighter of the Year
 2003 Rajadamnern Stadium Featherweight Champion (defended twice)
 2000 Rajadamnern Stadium Junior-bantamweight Champion
 1999 Rajadamnern Stadium Junior-flyweight Champion
 1998 Rajadamnern Stadium Mini-flyweight Champion
 World Muaythai Council
 2009 WMC Lightweight World Champion
 Lumpinee Stadium
 2005 Lumpinee Stadium Featherweight champion
 Onesongchai Promotion 
 S1 Featherweight World Champion
 World Professional Muaythai Federation
 2008 WPMF Featherweight World Champion
 WBC Muaythai
 2006 WBC Featherweight World Champion
 Omnoi Stadium
 2004 Omnoi Stadium Junior Featherweight Champion
 2004 14th Isuzu Cup Tournament Winner

Awards
2005 Sports Authority of Thailand Fighter of the Year
2004 Sports Authority of Thailand Fighter of the Year
 2004 Sports Writers Association of Thailand Fight of the Year (vs Singdam Kiatmuu9)
2004 Sports Writers Association of Thailand Fighter of the Year
2003 Sports Writers Association of Thailand Fighter of the Year

Muay Thai record

|-  bgcolor="FFBBBB"
| 2010-10-03 || Loss ||align=left| Kan Itabashi || KGS "RISE 71"  || Bunkyō, Tokyo, Japan || Decision (Unanimous) || 4(Ex.1) || 3:00
|-  bgcolor="#CCFFCC"
| 2010-07-11 || Win ||align=left| Shin Saenchaigym || NJKF "Muay Thai Open 12" || Kōtō, Tokyo, Japan || KO (Right cross) || 5 || 0:33
|-
! style=background:white colspan=9 |
|-
|-  bgcolor="#FFBBBB"
| 2010-07-03 || Loss ||align=left| Kurt Finlayson || Detonation 7 || Australia || Decision (Split) || 5 || 3:00
|-
! style=background:white colspan=9 |
|-
|-  bgcolor="#FFBBBB"
| 2010-05-29 || Loss ||align=left| Sergio Wielzen || Muaythai event in Geneva (135lbs) || Geneva, Switzerland || KO (Right high kick) || 1 || 0:30 
|-  bgcolor="#FFBBBB"
| 2010-03-27 || Loss ||align=left| Liam Harrison || MSA Muaythai Premier League (140lbs) || Manchester, England || Decision (Unanimous) || 5 || 3:00 
|-  bgcolor="#CCFFCC"
| 2010-03-01 || Win ||align=left| Kompayak Beemdesign || Daorungchujaroen Fights, Rajadamnern Stadium || Bangkok, Thailand || Decision (Unanimous)|| 5 || 3:00
|-
! style=background:white colspan=9 |
|-
|-  bgcolor="#FFBBBB"
| 2010-01-30 || Loss ||align=left| Sitthichai Sitsongpeenong || La Nuit Des Titans || Tours, France || Decision (Unanimous) || 3 || 3:00
|-
! style=background:white colspan=9 |
|-
|-  bgcolor="#CCFFCC"
| 2010-01-30 || Win ||align=left| Houcine Bennoui || La Nuit Des Titans || Tours, France || Decision (Unanimous) || 3 || 3:00
|-  bgcolor="#FFBBBB"
| 2009-11-29 || Loss ||align=left| Mohammed Khamal || SLAMM "Nederland vs Thailand VI" || Almere, Netherlands || Decision (Unanimous) || 5 || 3:00
|-
! style=background:white colspan=9 |
|-
|-  bgcolor="#FFBBBB"
| 2009-11-06 || Loss ||align=left| Yodsuper Purnrattana || Rajadamnern Stadium || Bangkok, Thailand || Decision || 5 || 3:00
|-  bgcolor="#CCFFCC"
| 2009-10-12 || Win ||align=left| Wuttidet Lukprabat || Muaythai Open 9: Road to Real King XIII || Japan || KO (Right punch) || 3 || 
|-  bgcolor="#FFBBBB"
| 2009-10-01 || Loss ||align=left| Mongkonchai Petsuphapan || Rajadamnern Stadium || Bangkok, Thailand || Decision || 5 || 3:00
|-  bgcolor="#CCFFCC"
| 2009-08-31 || Win ||align=left| Fahmai Skindewgym || Rajadamnern Stadium || Bangkok, Thailand || TKO || 5 || 
|-  bgcolor="#CCFFCC"
| 2009-06-26 || Win ||align=left| Liam Harrison || Champions of Champions 2 || Montego Bay, Jamaica || TKO (Right low kicks) || 3 || 0:35
|-
! style=background:white colspan=9 |
|-
|-  bgcolor="#FFBBBB"
| 2009-04-30 || Loss ||align=left| Sagetdao Petpayathai || Daorungchujarean Fights, Rajadamnern Stadium || Bangkok, Thailand || Decision || 5 || 3:00
|-  bgcolor="#CCFFCC"
| 2009-03-26 || Win ||align=left| Kamel Jemel || Les Stars du Ring 2009 || Levallois-Perret, France || KO (Body shot) || 1 || 
|-  bgcolor="#CCFFCC"
| 2009-02-12 || Win ||align=left| Kompayak Beemdesign || Jarummueang Fights, Rajadamnern Stadium || Bangkok, Thailand || Decision || 5 || 3:00
|-  bgcolor="#CCFFCC"
| 2009-03-01 || Win ||align=left| Shunta || M-1 Fairtex Muay Thai 2009 "Yod Nak Suu vol.1" || Japan || TKO (Right hook) || 1 || 2:05
|-
! style=background:white colspan=9 |
|-
|-  bgcolor="#FFBBBB"
| 2008-11-30 || Loss ||align=left| Mosab Amrani || SLAMM "Nederland vs Thailand V" || Almere, Netherlands || TKO (Doctor stoppage/cut) || 4 || 1:52
|-  bgcolor="#CCFFCC"
|-
! style=background:white colspan=9 |
|-
|-  bgcolor="#CCFFCC"
| 2008-10-02 || Win ||align=left| Phetek Sitjaopho || Daorungchujarean Fights, Rajadamnern Stadium || Bangkok, Thailand || KO || 3 || 
|-  bgcolor="#CCFFCC"
| 2008-08-22 || Win ||align=left| Santipab Sit. Au. Ubon || Sukeminent Air, Lumpinee Stadium || Bangkok, Thailand || Decision (Split) || 5 || 3:00
|-
! style=background:white colspan=9 |
|-
|-  bgcolor="#FFBBBB"
| 2008-07-31 || Loss ||align=left| Jomthong Chuwattana || Daorungchujarern Fights, Rajadamnern Stadium || Bangkok, Thailand || Decision (Unanimous) || 5 || 3:00
|-
! style=background:white colspan=9 |
|-
|-  bgcolor="#CCFFCC"
| 2008-06-12 || Win ||align=left| Imran Khan || || Levallois-Perret, France || Decision (Unanimous) || 5 || 3:00
|-  bgcolor="#CCFFCC"
| 2008-05-01 || Win ||align=left| Phandin Sor Damrongrit || Daorungchujarern Fights, Rajadamnern Stadium || Bangkok, Thailand || TKO || 3 || 
|-  style="background:#fbb;"
| 2008-03-31 || Loss ||align=left| Chok Eminentair || Daorungchujarern Fights, Rajadamnern Stadium || Bangkok, Thailand || Decision || 5 || 3:00
|-
|-  bgcolor="#c5d2ea"
| 2008-03-03 || Draw ||align=left| Hassan Ait Bassou || SLAMM "Nederland vs Thailand IV" (140lbs) || Almere, Netherlands || Decision || 5 || 3:00
|-
|-  bgcolor="#CCFFCC"
| 2008-01-24 || Win ||align=left| Phetassawin Zeezarnferry || Daorungchujarern Fights, Rajadamnern Stadium || Bangkok, Thailand || Decision || 5 || 3:00
|-  bgcolor="#FFBBBB"
| 2007-12-20 || Loss ||align=left| Lerdsila Chumpairtour || Daorungchujarern Fights, Rajadamnern Stadium || Bangkok, Thailand || Decision || 5 || 3:00
|-
|-  bgcolor="#CCFFCC"
| 2007-07-05 || Win ||align=left| Chalermdeth Infinity || Daowrungchujarern Fights, Rajadamnern Stadium || Bangkok, Thailand || Decision || 5 || 3:00
|-
|-  bgcolor="#CCFFCC"
| 2007-05-06 || Win ||align=left| Hassan Ait Bassou || SLAMM "Nederland vs Thailand III" (137lbs) || Haarlem, Netherlands || KO (Right hook) || 2 || 1:04
|-  bgcolor="#CCFFCC"
| 2007-04-06 || Win ||align=left| Sarawut Lookbanyai || Phetsupapan Fights, Lumpinee Stadium || Bangkok, Thailand || Decision || 5 || 3:00
|-
|-  bgcolor="#CCFFCC"
| 2007-03-08 || Win ||align=left| Singtongnoi Por.Telakun || Wansongchai Fights, Rajadamnern Stadium || Bangkok, Thailand || Decision || 5 || 3:00
|-
|-  bgcolor="#CCFFCC"
| 2007-02-02 || Win ||align=left| Ronnachai Naratreekun || S. Khunsuktrakoonyang Fights, Lumpinee Stadium || Bangkok, Thailand || Decision || 5 || 3:00
|-
|-  style="background:#c5d2ea"
| 2006-12-21 || Draw ||align=left| Jomthong Chuwattana || Birthday Show, Rajadamnern Stadium || Bangkok, Thailand || Decision || 5 || 3:00
|-
|-  bgcolor="#FFBBBB"
| 2006-11-16 || Loss ||align=left| Jomthong Chuwattana || Rajadamnern Stadium || Bangkok, Thailand || Decision || 5 || 3:00
|-
! style=background:white colspan=9 |
|-
|-  bgcolor="#CCFFCC"
| 2006-10-19 || Win ||align=left| Singtongnoi Por.Telakun ||  Wansongchai Fights, Rajadamnern Stadium || Bangkok, Thailand || TKO || 3 || 
|-
! style=background:white colspan=9 |
|-
|-  bgcolor="#c5d2ea"
| 2006-09-04 || Draw ||align=left| Singtongnoi Por.Telakun || Daorungchujaroen Fights, Rajadamnern Stadium || Bangkok, Thailand || Decision || 5 || 3:00
|-
! style=background:white colspan=9 |
|-
|-  bgcolor="#FFBBBB"
| 2006-07-28 || Loss ||align=left| Ronachai Naratreekoon || Khunsuk Takoonyang Fights, Lumpinee Stadium || Bangkok, Thailand || Decision || 5 || 3:00
|-
|-  bgcolor="#FFBBBB"
| 2006-07-05 || Loss ||align=left| Puja Sor Suwanee || Wansongchai Fights, Rajadamnern Stadium || Bangkok, Thailand || Decision (Unanimous) || 5 || 3:00
|-  bgcolor="#CCFFCC"
| 2006-05-13 || Win ||align=left| Mhand Boukedim || Le Thaï Tournament II : France vs Thaïlande (130lbs) || Genève, Switzerland || KO || 1 ||
|-  bgcolor="#fbb"
| 2006-04-06 || Loss ||align=left| Nongbee Kiatyongyut || Wansongchai Fights, Rajadamnern Stadium || Bangkok, Thailand || TKO (Knees) || 4 || 
|-  bgcolor="#CCFFCC"
| 2006-03-06 || Win ||align=left| Saenchainoi Nongkisuvit || Wansongchai Fights, Rajadamnern Stadium || Bangkok, Thailand || TKO || 3 || 
|-  bgcolor="#CCFFCC"
| 2006-01-25 || Win ||align=left| Puja S.Suwannee || Daorungchujarean Fights, Rajadamnern Stadium || Bangkok, Thailand || Decision || 5 || 3:00
|-  bgcolor="#CCFFCC"
| 2005-12-22 || Win ||align=left| Orono Tawan || Rajadamnern Celebration Fights || Bangkok, Thailand || TKO || 3 ||
|-  bgcolor="#FFBBBB"
| 2005-11-16 || Loss ||align=left| Seanchainoi Nongkisuvit || Wansongchai Fights, Rajadamnern Stadium || Bangkok, Thailand || Decision || 5 || 3:00
|-  bgcolor="#CCFFCC"
| 2005-10-29 || Win ||align=left| Riki Onodera || SNKA "Onodera Riki Retirement Memorial Event" (132lbs) || Ōta, Tokyo, Japan || KO (Right hook) || 2 || 2:18
|-  bgcolor="#CCFFCC"
| 2005-09-22 || Win ||align=left| Ronnachai Naratrikoon || Wansongchai Fights, Rajadamnern Stadium || Bangkok, Thailand || TKO (High kick) || 3 || 
|-  bgcolor="#CCFFCC"
| 2005-08-12 || Win ||align=left| Thongchai Tor. Silachai || Queens Birthday Superfights, Sanam Luang || Bangkok, Thailand || Decision (Unanimous) || 5 || 3:00
|-  bgcolor="#FFBBBB"
| 2005-07-20 || Loss ||align=left| Nongbee Kiatyongyut || Daorungchujarean Fights, Rajadamnern Stadium || Bangkok, Thailand || Decision|| 5 || 3:00
|-  bgcolor="#FFBBBB"
| 2005-06-22 || Loss ||align=left| Attachai N.Sipueng || Kiatsingnoi Fights, Rajadamnern Stadium || Bangkok, Thailand || Decision|| 5 || 3:00
|-  bgcolor="#CCFFCC"
| 2005-05-06 || Win ||align=left| Nopparat Keatkhamtorn || Phetyindee & K.Sapaotong Fights, Lumpinee Stadium || Bangkok, Thailand || TKO || 1 || 
|-
! style=background:white colspan=9 |
|-
|-  bgcolor="#CCFFCC"
| 2005-03-25 || Win ||align=left| Ngatao Sor Attarungrot || Palokmuaythai ITV, Omnoi Stadium || Bangkok, Thailand || KO ||  ||
|-  bgcolor="#CCFFCC"
| 2005-02-28 || Win ||align=left| Wuttidet Lukprabat || Daorungprabath Fights, Rajadamnern Stadium || Bangkok, Thailand || Decision || 5 || 3:00
|-  bgcolor="#CCFFCC"
| 2005-01-26 || Win ||align=left| Lerdsila Chumpairtour || Daorungchujarean Fights, Rajadamnern Stadium || Bangkok, Thailand || TKO || 4 || 
|-  bgcolor="#CCFFCC"
| 2004-12-23 || Win ||align=left| Rittidej Kor Sapaothong || Daorungchujarean Fights, Rajadamnern Stadium || Bangkok, Thailand || TKO || 4 || 
|-  bgcolor="#CCFFCC"
| 2004-11-29 || Win ||align=left| Seanchernglak Jirakrengkri || Daorungchujarean Fights, Rajadamnern Stadium || Bangkok, Thailand || Decision || 5 || 3:00
|-  bgcolor="#CCFFCC"
| 2004-10-25 || Win ||align=left| Puja Sor Suwanee || Palokmuaythai ITV, Omnoi Stadium || Bangkok, Thailand || TKO || 2 ||
|-  bgcolor="#FFBBBB"
| 2004-09-06 || Loss ||align=left| Seanchernglak Jirakrengkri || Daorungchujarean Fights, Rajadamnern Stadium || Bangkok, Thailand || Decision || 5 || 3:00
|-  bgcolor="#CCFFCC"
| 2004-06-17 || Win ||align=left| Kongpipop Petchyindee || Daorungchujarean Fights, Rajadamnern Stadium || Bangkok, Thailand || TKO (leg kicks) || 2 ||
|-
|-  bgcolor="#CCFFCC"
| 2004-05-04 || Win ||align=left| Singdam Kiatmoo9 || Petchyindee Fights, Lumpinee Stadium || Bangkok, Thailand || KO (Right cross) || 3 || 
|-  bgcolor="#CCFFCC"
| 2004-03-28 || Win ||align=left| Duwao Kongudom || Omnoi Stadium, Isuzu Cup tournament, final || Bangkok, Thailand || Decision || 3 || 3:00
|-
! style=background:white colspan=9 |
|-
|-  bgcolor="#CCFFCC"
| 2004- || Win ||align=left| Ronachai Naratrikun|| Omnoi Stadium, Isuzu Cup tournament, semifinal || Bangkok, Thailand || KO || 2 || 
|-  bgcolor="#FFBBBB"
| 2003- || Loss ||align=left| Duwao Kongudom || Isuzu Cup tournament || Bangkok, Thailand || Decision || 5 || 3:00

|-  bgcolor="#cfc"
| 2003- || Win ||align=left| Sakornphet NakhonthongParkView || Omnoi Stadium, Isuzu Cup tournament || Bangkok, Thailand || TKO || 2 ||

|-  bgcolor="#cfc"
| 2003-09-06 || Win ||align=left| Sayannoi Kiatpraphat || Omnoi Stadium, Isuzu Cup tournament || Bangkok, Thailand || Decision || 5 || 3:00
|-  bgcolor="#CCFFCC"
| 2003-08-06 || Win ||align=left| Mueangfahlak Keatwichian || SUK Daorungchujarean, Lumpinee Stadium || Bangkok, Thailand || TKO || 3 ||
|-
! style=background:white colspan=9 |
|-
|-  bgcolor="#CCFFCC"
| 2003-07-29 || Win ||align=left| Nopparat Keatkamton || DFD CommonReal3000 & Petchyindee, Lumpinee Stadium || Bangkok, Thailand || TKO || 1 ||

|-  bgcolor="#c5d2ea"
| 2003-06-13 || Draw ||align=left| Pornpitak Petchaudomchai || SUK Petchpiya, Lumpinee Stadium || Bangkok, Thailand || Decision || 5 || 3:00
|-
|-  bgcolor="#CCFFCC"
| 2003-04-30 || Win ||align=left| Singdam Kiatmoo9 || Daorungchujarean Fights, Rajadamnern Stadium || Bangkok, Thailand || KO || 3 ||

|-  bgcolor="#c5d2ea"
| 2003-03-14 || Draw ||align=left| Ritthichai Somkhidkada ||  Lumpinee Stadium || Bangkok, Thailand || Decision || 5 || 3:00

|-  bgcolor="#CCFFCC"
| 2003-02-05 || Win ||align=left| Mueangfahlak Keatwichian || Rajadamnern Stadium || Bangkok, Thailand || Decision || 5 || 3:00
|-
! style=background:white colspan=9 |

|-  bgcolor="#cfc"
| 2003-01-10 || Win ||align=left| Chatri Sithengjia || Lumpinee Stadium|| Bangkok, Thailand || Decision || 5 ||3:00

|-  bgcolor="#CCFFCC"
| 2002-12-03 || Win ||align=left| Yodbuangam Lukbanyai || Rajadamnern Stadium || Bangkok, Thailand || KO  ||4  ||

|-  bgcolor="#cfc"
| 2002- || Win||align=left| Chutin Sit Kuanim || Rajadamnern Stadium|| Bangkok, Thailand || Decision || 5 ||3:00

|-  bgcolor="#fbb"
| 2002- || Loss||align=left| Chutin Sit Kuanim || Rajadamnern Stadium|| Bangkok, Thailand || Decision || 5 ||3:00

|-  bgcolor="#fbb"
| 2002- || Loss||align=left| Sangheeran Lukbanyai || Lumpinee Stadium|| Bangkok, Thailand || Decision || 5 ||3:00

|-  bgcolor="#CCFFCC"
| 2002- || Win ||align=left| Saksit Sit.Or || Channel 7 Stadium || Bangkok, Thailand || TKO || 3 ||

|-  bgcolor="#CCFFCC"
| 2002- || Win ||align=left| Denthoranee NakhonthongParkView || Lumpinee Stadium|| Bangkok, Thailand || Decision || 5 ||3:00

|-  bgcolor="#CCFFCC"
| 2002-05-21 || Win ||align=left| Bovy Sor Udomson || Onesongchai || Bangkok, Thailand || TKO (Referee Stoppage) || 3 ||
|-  bgcolor="#c5d2ea"
| 2002-03-08 || Draw ||align=left| Thailand Pinsinchai || Lumpinee Stadium|| Bangkok, Thailand || Decision || 5 ||3:00

|-  bgcolor="#cfc"
| 2002- || Win ||align=left| Chalermphon Kiatsunanta || Lumpinee Stadium|| Bangkok, Thailand || TKO || 3 ||

|-  bgcolor="#CCFFCC"
| 2001-11-02 || Win ||align=left| Kongpipop Petchyindee || Lumpinee Stadium || Bangkok, Thailand || KO (Punches) || 3 ||
|-  bgcolor=""
| 2001-06-29 || ||align=left| Denthoranee Nakhorntongparkview || Lumpinee Stadium || Bangkok, Thailand ||  ||  ||
|-  bgcolor="#fbb"
| 2001-06-07 || Loss||align=left| Phet-ek Dejchusri || Rajadamnern Stadium || Bangkok, Thailand || Decision || 5 ||3:00
|-  bgcolor="#CCFFCC"
| 2001- || Win ||align=left| Nungubon Sitlerchai ||  || Bangkok, Thailand || Decision || 5 || 3:00
|-  bgcolor=""
| 2001-04-25 || ||align=left| Ngatao Sor Attarungrot || Rajadamnern Stadium || Bangkok, Thailand ||  ||  ||
|-  bgcolor="#CCFFCC"
| 2000-12-15 || Win ||align=left| Thailand Pinsinchai || Kiatpetch, Lumpinee Stadium || Bangkok, Thailand ||  ||  ||
|-  bgcolor="#CCFFCC"
| 2000-10-24 || Win ||align=left| Lertnimit Phetsuphapan|| Lumpinee Stadium || Bangkok, Thailand || Decision || 5 ||3:00
|-  bgcolor="#CCFFCC"
| 2000-07-14 || Win ||align=left| Naruenat Phetpayathai || Lumpinee Stadium || Bangkok, Thailand || Decision || 5 ||3:00
|-  bgcolor="#fbb"
| 2000-06-28 || Loss||align=left| Kumanthong Por.Plumkamon || Rajadamnern Stadium || Bangkok, Thailand || Decision || 5 ||3:00
|-  bgcolor="#CCFFCC"
| 2000-02-02 || Win ||align=left| Prakaipetch Kiatpailin || Rajadamnern Stadium || Bangkok, Thailand ||  ||  ||
|-
! style=background:white colspan=9 |
|-  bgcolor="#CCFFCC"
| 1999-12-14 || Win ||align=left| Sanchoenglek Jirakriengkrai || Rajadamnern Stadium || Bangkok, Thailand || Decision  || 5 || 3:00
|-  bgcolor=""
| 1999-10-26 || ||align=left| Sitrak Asawayothin || Rajadamnern Stadium || Bangkok, Thailand ||  ||  ||
|-  bgcolor="#CCFFCC"
| 1999-10-04 || Win ||align=left| Yodbunagam Lukbanyai || Rajadamnern Stadium || Bangkok, Thailand || KO (Straight Right)  || 3 ||
|-
|-  bgcolor="#CCFFCC"
| 1999-09-02 || Win ||align=left| Kayasit Chuwattana || Rajadamnern Stadium || Bangkok, Thailand || Decision  || 5 || 3:00
|-  bgcolor="#cfc"
| 1999-07-29 || Win ||align=left| Boonlert Por.Thawatchai ||  || Bangkok, Thailand || Decision || 5 ||3:00
|-  bgcolor="#cfc"
| 1999-07-08 || Win ||align=left| Kantipong Luktapakart ||  Rajadamnern Stadium || Bangkok, Thailand || Decision || 5 ||3:00
|-  bgcolor="#CCFFCC"
| 1999-06-10 || Win ||align=left| Kayasit Sakmuangklaeng || Rajadamnern Stadium || Bangkok, Thailand ||  ||  ||
|-
! style=background:white colspan=9 |
|-  bgcolor="#CCFFCC"
| 1999-05-06 || Win ||align=left| Prakyapetch Kiatpaillin || Rajadamnern Stadium || Bangkok, Thailand || Decision || 5 || 3:00
|-  bgcolor="#c5d2ea"
| 1999- || Draw||align=left| Morakot Chumpartour ||  || Bangkok, Thailand || Decision || 5 ||3:00
|-  bgcolor="#cfc"
| 1999- || Win ||align=left| Surachai||  || Bangkok, Thailand || Decision || 5 ||3:00
|-  bgcolor="#cfc"
| 1999-01-27 || Win ||align=left| Raksotsot Sor.Kittichai ||  || Bangkok, Thailand || Decision || 5 ||3:00
|-  bgcolor="#fbb"
| 1998-12-23 || Loss ||align=left| Phokaew Sitchafuang ||  || Bangkok, Thailand || Decision || 5 ||3:00
|-  bgcolor="#CCFFCC"
| 1998-11-18 || Win ||align=left| Klangsuan Sasiprapagym || Rajadamnern Stadium || Bangkok, Thailand || TKO || 4 ||
|-
! style=background:white colspan=9 |
|-  bgcolor="#CCFFCC"
| 1998-10-31 || Win ||align=left| Hinari Fukatsu || SNKA || Bunkyō, Tokyo, Japan || TKO || 5 || 0:56
|-
| colspan=9 | Legend:

See also 
List of male kickboxers

External links
Kaewsamrit Gym

References

1981 births
Living people
Flyweight kickboxers
Bantamweight kickboxers
Featherweight kickboxers
Lightweight kickboxers
Anuwat Kaewsamrit
Anuwat Kaewsamrit
Anuwat Kaewsamrit
Southeast Asian Games medalists in wushu
Competitors at the 2009 Southeast Asian Games